Frank Hughes School is a public comprehensive K–12 school located in Clifton, Tennessee.  It is part of the Wayne County School System. In 1986, the girls' basketball team had a 35-3 win/loss record and won the class A State Championship.

References

External links
 Frank Hughes School

Public elementary schools in Tennessee
Public middle schools in Tennessee
Public high schools in Tennessee
K-12 schools in Tennessee